Amphibolia obscura is a species of plant in the family Aizoaceae. It is endemic to Namibia.  Its natural habitat is rocky areas. It is threatened by habitat loss.

References

Flora of Namibia
obscura
Least concern plants
Taxonomy articles created by Polbot
Plants described in 1998